Dew is a surname. People with the name include:

Albert George Dew-Smith (né Dew; 1848–1903), English scientist and photographer
Sir Armine Dew (1867–1941), British soldier and colonial administrator
Carrie Dew (born 1986), American footballer
Charles B. Dew (born 1944), American historian
Diana Dew (1943–2008), American fashion designer
Earl Dew (1921–1941), American champion jockey
Eddie Dew (1909–1972), American actor, film director, and television director
George Dew (1666–1703), Caribbean pirate
George Dew (politician) (1853/1854–1931), British politician
John Dew (cricketer) (1920–2008), English cricketer
John Dew (cardinal) (born 1948), Roman Catholic Archbishop of Wellington and metropolitan of New Zealand
John Dew (director) (born 1944), British opera director
Josie Dew (fl. 1997–2007), English cyclist & author
Marianne Dew (born 1938), English sprinter
Martin Dew (fl. 1982–1987), English badminton player
Robb Forman Dew (1946–2020), American author
Sam Dew, American musician
Sheri L. Dew (born 1953), American Mormon speaker & writer
Stuart Dew (born 1979), Australian rules footballer
Susan Dew Hoff (1842–1933), American physician
Thomas Dew (politician) (died ), Virginia colonial politician
Thomas Roderick Dew (1802–1846), American educator & writer
Walter Dew (1863–1947), English police detective

See also
Dew (disambiguation)
Dewes, for people with the name
Dews, for people with the name
Colleen Dewe (1930–1993), New Zealand politician